IB5 may refer to:
 a model of Ford IB transmission
 protein IB5, a human salivary protein